TPx (also known as TPx Communications, U.S. TelePacific Corp; formerly TelePacific Communications) is a privately held leading national provider of managed services. Founded in 1998, TPx delivers managed IT, unified communications as a service (UCaaS), secure networks and cybersecurity services to approximately 23,000 customers with more than 50,000 locations across the U.S. TPx’s customers span every business sector and industry.

Company background
Founded in 1998, TPx’s initial focus was providing local connectivity as a California Competitive Local Exchange Carrier (CLEC) although that shifted quickly to provide the customer base with more flexibility and functionality. TPx expanded its portfolio to include multi-location networking services, nationwide coverage, cloud-based applications, unified communications and security threat protection to address industry needs. 

TPx is headquartered in Austin, TX and has regional offices across the country. It changed its name to TPx Communications (DBA TPx) from TelePacific Communications in April 2017. On February 12, 2020, the company was acquired by affiliates of Siris Capital Group, LLC (“Siris”), a leading private equity firm focused on investing and driving value creation in technology and telecommunications companies.

TPx is currently led by Rick Mace. Other key executives include Brent Novak, Chief Financial Officer; Patti Key, Chief Revenue Officer; Mark Roberts, Chief Marketing Officer; Aditi Dravid, Senior Vice President, General Counsel and Secretary; Carol Hilliard, Senior Vice President, Operations; Dean Hilderhoff, Senior Vice President of Human Resources; Barbara Porter, Chief of Staff, EPMO.

Services
TPx offers a range of services that help businesses simplify operations, optimize networks, improve productivity, reduce costs and keep IT environments secure. These services include:
 Managed IT & Networks
 Managed Security
 Unified Communications

Recent acquisitions
TPx expanded its markets, customer base, and service portfolio by acquiring a number of communications companies.

In September 2016, TPx (then TelePacific) acquired leading managed services provider DSCI.  With the addition of DSCI's Northeastern presence and customer base, TPx accelerated its transition from a regional to national managed services provider.  Key DSCI products included unified communications and managed IT solutions.

In May 2011, TPx announced plans to acquire Orange County Internet Xchange and finalized the acquisition in June 2011.  

In June 2011, TPx announced the acquisition of Tel West in Texas, which expanded TelePacific's footprint into Texas. Tel West brought TelePacific about 3,400 Small and Medium Business (SMB) customers across Texas, as well as a service portfolio of high speed Internet and other telecommunications services, including nationwide capabilities. 

In August 2010, TPx purchased Sacramento-based 01 Communications Inc's retail customer business as well as its downtown Sacramento data center.

In December 2010, TPx announced the purchase of Covad Wireless, also known as NextWeb, Inc., from MegaPath, allowing TelePacific to offer more services to enterprise customers in California and Nevada. 

TPx distributes and sells its services through a mix of independent sales channels: direct, wholesale, and channel partners.

References

Telecommunications companies established in 1998
Telecommunications companies of the United States